Jaan Eigo (31 October 1866 Vana-Võidu Parish (now Viljandi Parish), Kreis Fellin – 30 October 1946 Viljandi) was an Estonian politician. He was a member of the I and II Riigikogu, representing the Farmers' Assemblies Party.

References

1866 births
1946 deaths
People from Viljandi Parish
People from Kreis Fellin
Farmers' Assemblies politicians
Members of the Riigikogu, 1920–1923
Members of the Riigikogu, 1923–1926